The Karmanghat Hanuman Temple is one of the oldest and popular Hindu temples in Hyderabad, in the state of Telangana, India. The presiding deity of the temple is Lord Hanuman and the temple complex also houses other deities viz. Lord Rama, Lord Shiva, Goddess Saraswathi, Goddess Durga, Goddess Santoshimata, Lord Venugopala Swamy, and Lord Jagannath. The temple is located at Karmanghat, near Santoshnagar and closer to the Nagarjuna Sagar Ring Road.

Temple is open from 6am to 12 noon and 4:30pm to 8:30pm on all days except Tuesdays and Saturdays, where it is open from 5.30am to 1pm and 4:30pm to 9pm.

History
It was built in the 12th century A.D (approximately 1143). When the Kakatiya king Prola II went hunting and was resting under a tree, he heard the chanting of Lord Rama's name. Wondering who it was in the middle of a dense forest, he discovered a stone idol of God Hanuman, in seated posture and the voice coming from the vigraha. Having paid his respects, he returned to his capital, and that night, Lord appeared in his dream and asked him to construct a temple.

Aurangzeb sent out his armies to all corners of the country for further expansion of Mughal Empire. At this temple, the army couldn't even step close to the compound wall. When the general reported this to Aurangzeb, he himself went with a crow bar to break down the temple. At the threshold of the temple, he heard a deafening roar rumbling like thunder, and the crowbar slipped from his hands as he was shaking in fear. Then he heard a voice in the heavens "Mandir todna hai , to karo man ghat" (translation: "If you want to break down the temple, harden your heart.") which is why the place got the name kar-man-ghat.
And to this day, Lord Anjaneya sits peacefully meditating and blessing devotees, as Dhyana Anjaneya Swamy.

Present Day
The temple is very popular among devotees in Hyderabad. Faithfuls offer prayers and perform religious rituals for Lord Hanuman at the temple on Tuesday's and Saturday's every week. On the auspicious day of Hanuman Jayanti, devotees visit the temple in large numbers to offer special pooja to the Lord and celebrate his birthday. The temple management provides "annadanam" meaning free meal to limited people on all days of the year. To this day, Lord Anjaneya sits peacefully meditating and blessing devotees, as Dhyana Anjaneya Swamy.

References

Referral
 Karmanghat Hanuman Temple Timings

Hindu temples in Hyderabad, India
Hanuman temples